Col. Thomas Waring JP (17 October 1828 – 12 August 1898) was an Irish barrister and Conservative Member of Parliament in the House of Commons at Westminster.

Life
Born at his family's ancestral home, Waringstown House, Waringstown, County Down, then son of Major Henry Waring JP and Frances Grace Waring (herself the daughter of the Very Rev. Holt Waring, Dean of Dromore). Waring was elected Member of Parliament for North Down in 1885, sitting until his death in 1898.  He also served as High Sheriff of Down in 1868.  He was an opponent of William Ewart Gladstone's Home Rule policy.

Family
His first wife, Esther Smyth of Ardmore, Co. Londonderry, died in 1873, aged 36, Waring married, secondly, on 6 August 1874, Fanny Tucker, of Trematon Castle, Cornwall.  Fanny Waring died on 13 November 1883.  Waring married for a third time, at Rostrevor, to Geraldine Stewart, of Ballyedmond, Rostrevor, Co. Down.

References

External links
 

1828 births
1898 deaths
People from Waringstown
High Sheriffs of Down
Irish Conservative Party MPs
Irish Unionist Party MPs
Members of the Parliament of the United Kingdom for County Down constituencies (1801–1922)
UK MPs 1885–1886
UK MPs 1886–1892
UK MPs 1892–1895
UK MPs 1895–1900